A Wesley Foundation is a United Methodist campus ministry sponsored in full or in part (depending on the congregation) by the United Methodist Church on a non-church owned and operated campus.  Wesley Foundations claim ancestry in the founding "Holy Club" of the Methodist movement, a group of students at Oxford University guided by Wesley in "methodical" (hence "Methodist") study, prayer, and self-discipline.  Today a Wesley Foundation is the presence of the United Methodist Church on or near, and in service to, a state-run, non-church affiliated college or university (Church-related schools have Chaplains that may guide similar groups).

The first Wesley Foundation was established October 13, 1913 at the University of Illinois.  Bishop James C. Baker's work in organizing this first Wesley Foundation chose the name Wesley Foundation to emphasize two spheres of outreach.  Wesley refers to John Wesley the founder of the Methodist Church and first campus minister at Oxford University, while Foundation was selected to mean an "open movement," an ecumenical movement available to all college students.

Wesley Foundations are primarily found in the United States, Canada and the United Kingdom, but can also be found in a number of other countries around the world. They are governed by the basic unit of the United Methodist Church, the annual conference; ordained ministers are appointed by their annual conference or lay ministers are hired to serve Wesley Foundations as campus minister. Ordained ministers serve in similar manner to their usual appointment to a church or charge.

External links
Southwestern Oklahoma State University- Wesley Foundation
Northwestern Oklahoma State University- Wesley Foundation
University of West Georgia- Wesley Foundation
The Wesley Foundation at the University of Virginia
University of Maryland College Park Wesley Foundation
The Wesley Foundation at Howard University
Angelo State University Wesley Foundation
Appalachian Wesley Foundation at Appalachian State University
Campus to City Wesley Foundation
 University of Michigan Wesley Foundation Campus Ministry
Wesley Foundation at Jacksonville State University
Louisiana Tech University Wesley Foundation
University of Kentucky Wesley Foundation
Emory Wesley Fellowship at Emory University
Wesley Foundation at Louisiana State University
Georgia Tech Wesley Foundation
University of Georgia Wesley Foundation
Arizona State University Wesley Foundation
University of Arizona Wesley Foundation
Florida State University Wesley Foundation  
University of Florida Wesley Foundation
University Christian Ministry at Northwestern University
Wesley Campus Ministry at Sam Houston State University
Wesley Foundation at Stephen F. Austin University
Wesley Foundation at Texas Tech University
Wesley Foundation at Texas A&M University
Mississippi State University Wesley Foundation
Wesley Foundation at the University of Central Oklahoma
Wesley Foundation at Old Dominion University
Wesley Foundation at Arkansas Tech University
Wesley Foundation at the University of Central Arkansas
Wesley Foundation at Wake Forest University
 The Wesley Foundation at Michigan State University
Wesley Campus Ministry at UNC-Chapel Hill
Raleigh Wesley Foundation
The Wesley Fellowship at Duke University
The Wesley Foundation at Western Carolina University
 The Wesley Foundation at Penn State University
The Wesley Foundation at Valdosta State University
 Wesley Foundation Campus Ministry at the University of Delaware
 Wesley Foundation Campus Ministry at the University of Colorado - CU
 Wesley Foundation at the University of Illinois
The Wesley Foundation at Virginia Tech
Wesley Foundation in Cincinnati
General Board of Higher Education
United Methodist Campus Ministers Association
United Methodist Student Movement (UMSM)
Student Forum of the UMSm
USA Wesley Foundation
Wesley Foundation Serving University of California, Los Angeles
Wesley Foundation at New Mexico State University
Wesley of Wilmington (WoW)
East Tennessee State University Wesley Foundation
Oklahoma State University Wesley Foundation
University of Tulsa Wesley Foundation
Wesley Foundation at University of Tennessee, Knoxville
Wesley Foundation at Memphis
The Wesley Foundation at the University of South Florida
NOLA Wesley Foundation
The Wesley Foundation at the University of Oklahoma
The Wesley Foundation at Purdue University
University of Arkansas Wesley College Ministry
Longwood University and Hampden-Sydney College
Wesley Foundation at the University of Minnesota Twin Cities
→
Methodism
United Methodist Church
History of Methodism in the United States
Student religious organizations in the United States
International student religious organizations
Fellowships
Student societies in the United States